Jonatan Kotzke (born 18 May 1990) is a German professional footballer who plays as either a centre-back or a defensive midfielder for Ekstraklasa club Górnik Zabrze. He previously played for 1860 Munich, Jahn Regensburg, SV Wehen Wiesbaden, VfR Aalen and FC Ingolstadt 04.

References

External links
 
 

Living people
1990 births
People from Pinneberg
Footballers from Schleswig-Holstein
German footballers
Association football midfielders
2. Bundesliga players
3. Liga players
Ekstraklasa players
1. FC Nürnberg II players
TSV 1860 Munich II players
TSV 1860 Munich players
SSV Jahn Regensburg players
SV Wehen Wiesbaden players
VfR Aalen players
FC Gießen players
FC Ingolstadt 04 II players
FC Ingolstadt 04 players
Górnik Zabrze players
German expatriate footballers
German expatriate sportspeople in Poland
Expatriate footballers in Poland